Know No Better is a 2017 EP by Major Lazer.

Know No Better may also refer to:

 "Know No Better" (song), by Major Lazer, featuring Travis Scott, Camila Cabello and Quavo, 2017
 "Know No Better", a song by Justin Bieber featuring DaBaby, from the 2021 album Justice